The European Research Group (ERG) is a research support group and caucus of Eurosceptic Conservative Members of Parliament of the United Kingdom. The journalist Sebastian Payne described it in the Financial Times as "the most influential [research group] in recent political history".

Serving an annual average of 21 MPs including cabinet members, the group's focus is the single issue of the UK's withdrawal from the European Union.

History

Origins and Pre-EU referendum, 1993–2016 
In July 1993 Sir Michael Spicer, the then MP for West Worcestershire, created the European Research Group in response to growing concerns about Britain's continued integration into the European Community through the Maastricht Treaty. The Eurosceptic group, which was chaired by Spicer, aimed to promote coordination of right-of-centre opposition across Europe and worked alongside other anti-EU groups such as UKIP and the Referendum Party. Support for the group was boosted in 1995 after it published an anti-federalist pamphlet discussing Euroscepticism which included a foreword by Prime Minister John Major.

Contributors to the research output of the ERG have included Daniel Hannan and Mark Reckless who wrote a paper 'The Euro: bad for business' and Hannan acted as the ERG's first secretary in 1993 according to The Guardian.

An unexpected consequence of the creation of the Independent Parliamentary Standards Authority (IPSA), under the Parliamentary Standards Act 2009 and in response to the parliamentary expenses scandal of 2009, was the formation of a sustainable revenue stream for the ERG through the formal mechanism of IPSA's administration of MP's subscriptions to pooled services. This created an opportunity for the ERG, an unincorporated association with no obligation to publish accounts, to fund researchers and establish a social media communications network at taxpayer's expense.

Senior researchers have included Robert Broadhurst, Conservative Parliamentary Researcher of the Year 2010 in the Dods Parliamentary researcher awards, and Christopher Howarth, formerly of Open Europe and son of ERG subscriber Gerald Howarth, who succeeded Broadhurst. In November 2016, Howarth represented the ERG at the parliamentary researchers' and academics' conference on Brexit He is a regular contributor to ConservativeHome and City A.M..

In the period leading up to the EU referendum ten members of ERG acted in an official capacity for Vote Leave:

Since the Brexit referendum
Following the result of the Brexit referendum in 2016 Chris Heaton-Harris MP resigned as ERG's chair and the new chair Steve Baker and deputy chair Michael Tomlinson announced a relaunch of the ERG, calling for the government to withdraw from the European Economic Area (EEA) and the European Union Customs Union. Baker was subsequently promoted to Parliamentary Under-Secretary of State for Exiting the European Union and in May 2017 Suella Braverman replaced him as the group's chair.
In January 2018, Braverman was also promoted to the Department for Exiting the European Union as Parliamentary Under-Secretary of State making way for Jacob Rees-Mogg to be elected.

On 11 September 2018, members of the ERG met in Westminster to discuss plans to bring down the then prime minister, Theresa May.

On 4 February 2018, columnist Peter Wilby was highly critical, writing that "The highly secretive body seems to devote most of its efforts to what, if it were left-wing, would be called plotting." In the same article, he quotes The Times as saying it is "the most aggressive and successful political cadre in Britain today".

On 15 February 2019, the Press Association reported that "Critics, however, accuse it of acting as a “party within a party”, running its own whipping operation in support of its objective of a so-called “hard” Brexit, if necessary leaving without any deal with Brussels."

On 26 July 2018, the German public international broadcaster Deutsche Welle reported that "The European Research Group is a lobbying entity pushing for a no-nonsense, hard Brexit. Some say it is essentially running the show, not the British government." and "In February 2017, the group sent a letter to May setting out their hard-line Brexit demands: Britain should not only leave the EU but also the single market and customs union. That prompted Tory MP Nicky Morgan, who voted remain, to accuse the ERG of holding Theresa May to ransom. Her then colleague Anna Soubry was equally scathing and said that Jacob Rees-Mogg was "running our country. Theresa May is no longer in charge."

On 11 March 2019, the Constitution Unit in the Department of Political Science at University College London reported in Monitor 71 that "The Conservatives have their own party-within-a-party, in the strongly pro-Brexit European Research Group. After many false starts, it forced a vote of no confidence in Theresa May’s leadership of the party in December, which she won by 200 votes to 117."

Many new Conservative MPs elected in the 2019 general election joined the group.

In Government
On 6 September 2022 Liz Truss succeeded Boris Johnson as Prime Minister and appointed known ERG subscribers to nine senior Cabinet positions including two of the Great Offices of State in her new government:

 Thérèse Coffey was appointed Deputy Prime Minister and Secretary of State for Health and Social Care.
 Suella Braverman was appointed Home Secretary resigning after 6 weeks, following a ministerial breach of security protocol.
 James Cleverly was appointed Foreign Secretary.
 Brandon Lewis was appointed Secretary of State for Justice and Lord Chancellor.
 Penny Mordaunt was appointed Leader of the House of Commons and Lord President of the Council.
 Jacob Rees-Mogg was appointed Secretary of State for Business, Energy and Industrial Strategy.
 Kit Malthouse was appointed Secretary of State for Education.
 Anne-Marie Trevelyan was appointed Secretary of State for Transport.
 Chris Heaton-Harris was appointed Secretary of State for Northern Ireland.

On 25 October 2022 Rishi Sunak succeeded Liz Truss as Prime Minister without ERG endorsement but appointed ERG members to seven senior Cabinet positions:

 James Cleverly was reappointed Foreign Secretary.
 Suella Braverman was appointed Home Secretary.
 Penny Mordaunt was reappointed Leader of the House of Commons and Lord President of the Council.
 Michael Gove was appointed Secretary of State for Levelling Up, Housing and Communities.
 Thérèse Coffey was appointed Secretary of State for Environment, Food and Rural Affairs.
 Anne-Marie Trevelyan was appointed Minister of State for Indo-Pacific.
 Chris Heaton-Harris was reappointed Secretary of State for Northern Ireland.

Structure

Chair 
Sir Michael Spicer (1994–2001)
David Heathcoat-Amory (2001–2010)
Chris Heaton-Harris (2010–2016)
Steve Baker (2016–2017)
Suella Braverman (2017–2018)
Jacob Rees-Mogg (2018–2019)
 Steve Baker (2019–2020)
 Mark Francois (2020–present)

Deputy Chair 
 Suella Braverman (2016–2017)
 Michael Tomlinson (2016–2018)
 Mark Francois (2018–2020)
 Steve Baker (2018–2019)
Andrea Jenkyns (2019–present)
David Jones (2020–present)

Subscribers 
Subscribers to the pooled service provided by the European Research Group can be identified on the Independent Parliamentary Standards Authority records of Parliamentary expenses. As an unincorporated association the group does not publish membership details or annual accounts. Various media reports speculate that a wider membership exists and on 1 May 2019, following a ruling by the Information Commissioner's Office that the Department for Exiting the European Union must reveal the existence of an email to the group from Steve Baker, openDemocracy published a report on a wider membership.

Past subscribers 
Daniel Kawczynski resigned from the ERG on 8 April 2019, stating: "I can no longer be a member of a caucus which is preventing WA4 [a fourth vote on the Brexit withdrawal agreement] from passing."
David Gauke

Funding 
ERG subscriptions are taxpayer-funded through Independent Parliamentary Standards Authority (IPSA)-funded pooled service within the formal IPSA Scheme of MPs' Business Costs and Expenses and is one of two such publicly funded pooled services maintained for Conservative MPs.

The ERG has drawn criticism for its lack of transparency regarding its use of public funds to carry out research. A 2017 report by openDemocracy found that more than a quarter of a million pounds had been claimed through MPs' official expenses since 2010, after which Labour MPs called for an inquiry to be carried out by the IPSA into the group's practices. OpenDemocracy's September 2017 report commenced:

In July 2019 a tribunal declared that the ERG's research must be made public.

The ERG has also been funded by a secretive group called the Constitutional Research Council.

See also 
55 Tufton Street - a building in Westminster which hosts a network of libertarian lobby groups and think tanks related to pro-Brexit, climate science denial and other fossil fuel lobby groups.
Blue Collar Conservativism - a Brexit supporting pressure group of Conservative MPs, relaunched in May 2019.
Bruges Group - an independent Eurosceptic think tank.
Common Sense Group - inspired by the ERG.
Conservative Way Forward - a Eurosceptic, Thatcherite pressure group.
Institute of Economic Affairs - a right wing think tank.
Leave Means Leave – a campaign group which many ERG members were involved in.
Maastricht Rebels – a group of Conservative MPs that voted against their leader John Major in opposition to the Maastricht Treaty.
Monday Club - a Conservative aligned pressure group.
TaxPayers' Alliance - a libertarian Conservative think tank founded by Matthew Elliott, chief executive of Vote Leave.
Vote Leave - a designated campaign organisation whose campaign director was political strategist Dominic Cummings.

References 

Organizations established in 1993
European Union–related advocacy groups in the United Kingdom
Euroscepticism in the United Kingdom
Brexit–related advocacy groups in the United Kingdom
1993 establishments in the United Kingdom
Organisations associated with the Conservative Party (UK)
Research groups
Conservative Party (UK) factions